Olena Gliebova (born 19 January 1981) is a retired visually impaired Ukrainian Paralympic athlete who competed in international level events.

References

1981 births
Living people
People from Horishni Plavni
Paralympic athletes of Ukraine
Ukrainian female sprinters
Athletes (track and field) at the 2012 Summer Paralympics
Athletes (track and field) at the 2016 Summer Paralympics
Medalists at the World Para Athletics Championships
Medalists at the World Para Athletics European Championships
Sportspeople from Poltava Oblast
Visually impaired sprinters
Paralympic sprinters